HKPA may refer to:
 Hong Kong Playground Association, a not for profit organisation
 Hong Kong Progressive Alliance, was a political party of Hong Kong